Armen Petrosyan (born November 6, 1986) is an Armenian-born Italian kickboxer who competes in the middleweight division. An aggressive fighter, Petrosyan began training in Muay Thai after moving to Italy from Armenia. Petrosyan and his brother Giorgio Petrosyan were put under contract with Oktagon management, he became a two-time Italian champion and a European titleist before arriving on the world stage in 2010 when he took back-to-back wins over Vuyisile Colossa and Dzhabar Askerov and later appeared as a competitor on the Enfusion reality television show. In March 2013, he won the eight-man Haarlem Fight Night IV tournament in the Netherlands to be crowned the WMTA World Super Welterweight Champion.

Early life
Armen Petrosyan was born in Yerevan, Armenian SSR, Soviet Union (now Armenia) and moved to Gorizia, Italy, at the age of thirteen with his mother, Karine, and sister, Lianna, joining up with his father, Andranik, and older brothers Giorgio and Stepan who had moved to the country a year earlier. He is a naturalized Italian citizen.

Career
Petrosyan rose to prominence by becoming the World Professional Kickboxing Council (WPKC) Italian Champion in 2006 and the Muay Thai Association (MTA) European Champion in 2007. On November 16, 2008, he competed in the Dodge Trophy 2008 at 73 kg/161 lb in Ulm, Germany, losing to Vladimír Moravčík by knockout in the final.

He defeated Abdallah Mabel at the Ring Rules event in Milan, Italy, on January 30, 2009, a win that earned him a place on the Oktagon presents: It's Showtime 2009 card held on March 14, 2009 where he beat Arnaldo Silva via unanimous decision. Just over a month later, on April 24, 2009, in Trieste, Italy, Petrosyan faced Mauro Serra for the MTA Italian -70 kg/154 lb belt. He scored a knockdown early in round one with a vicious right hook before finishing his opponent off with a barrage of punches soon after to win his second national title. He would lose the title later that year when he dropped a decision at the hands of Carlo DiPaula. Petrosyan ended the year by facing one of Thailand's top middleweights in Saiyok Pumpanmuang at Janus Fight Night: Thai Boxe Last Challenge on November 7, 2009 in Padua, Italy, where he lost by unanimous decision after a three round affair.

At the beginning of 2010, Petrosyan moved up the rankings with back-to-back wins over veteran competition. After outpointing Vuyisile Colossa in Ko Samui, Thailand on January 20, 2010, he took another points win over Dzhabar Askerov at Oktagon presents: It's Showtime 2010 in Milan on March 13, 2010. He then lost a decision to Marco Piqué in Palermo, Italy, on June 26, 2010 before going on to take part in the first season of the Enfusion reality television show in Ko Samui. He made it to the semi-finals which took place on July 10, 2010 in Lisbon, Portugal where he faced Pajonsuk SuperPro Samui. Both men were deducted a point by referee Joop Ubeda, Pajonsuk for using his patented throws (illegal under Oriental rules) in round two and Petrosyan for unknown reasons (possibly for clinching or a perceived lack of respect for the referee) in the third, and the bout went into an extension round after ending in a draw. While Petrosyan attacked with punches in the fourth stanza, it was Pajonsuk's body kicks which scored highest as the Thai took the judges' decision. He rebounded with a unanimous decision victory over Leroy Kaestner at Janus Fight Night 2010 in Padua on December 4, 2010.

After a decision win over Miodrag Olar at Thai Boxe Mania in Turin, Italy, on January 29, 2011 brought his winning streak to two, Petrosyan was matched up with Yoshihiro Sato, who his brother Giorgio had defeated in the K-1 World MAX 2010 Tournament final five months earlier. Going down as the co-main event of Oktagon 2011 in Milan on March 12, 2011, both men traded heavy shots in the first round but Petrosyan began to pull away in the second by utilizing sweeps. Much of round three was fought in the clinch and, although Sato landed some solid knees, Petrosyan was given a unanimous decision win on the judges' scorecards. With this win, he jumped from #25 to #15 in the world middleweight rankings. He was unable to keep his momentum going, however, as he fought to a draw with Warren Stevelmans in his next outing in Rome, Italy, on June 11, 2011. Despite this minor set-back, he was still able to break the top ten in the world rankings, coming in at #9.

Petrosyan was then invited to compete in the Fight Code Dragon Series, a sixteen-man -72.5 kg/160 lb tournament held throughout Europe over the course of 2011, and he was entered into the competition at the quarter-final stage against eventual champion Yuri Bessmertny. The pair first met in Marseille, France, on October 15, 2011 with Bessmertny coming away with a controversial split decision win. However, it later emerged that the French sporting commission had not allowed the Fight Code promotion's complete rule set just hours before the event and so a rematch was set for Geneva, Switzerland on November 26, 2011. Petrosyan came out aggressive in round one but was caught with a counter punch and knocked down. After beating the referee's count, he kept up the aggression and was hit with a vicious right hook from the Belarusian, this time knocking him out. With these two consecutive losses, Petrosyan dropped out of the top ten rankings.

He was able to bounce back with a dominant TKO of Djimé Coulibaly at the Yokkao Extreme 2012 supercard in Milan on January 21, 2012, dropping the Frenchman a total of four times in the first two rounds and forcing a referee stoppage. After almost a year out of the ring, Petrosyan returned to defeat Marco Della Gaggia on points in Naples, Italy, on December 15, 2012.

On March 24, 2013, Petrosyan defeated three opponents in one night to win the vacant WMTA World Super Welterweight (-69.85 kg/154 lb) Championship at Haarlem Fight Night IV in Haarlem, Netherlands. After stopping Nick Beljaards in the first round of their quarter-final with three knockdowns, he cruised to a decision over Robbie Hagemen in the semis. In the final, he faced Henri van Opstal in match set for five rounds. Petrosyan didn't need that long, however, as he damaged van Opstal with low kicks and throws and caused the Dutchman's trainer Andy Souwer to throw in the towel at the end of the third round.

He was expected to fight Samo Petje in Trieste on July 5, 2013 but the fight seemingly fell through. He defeated Mirko Vorkapić via UD in a rematch at Gorizia Fight Night in Gorizia, Italy, on September 28, 2013 before losing to Alim Nabiev by the same margin at W5 Grand Prix Orel XXII in Oryol, Russia on November 16, 2013.

On January 25, 2014, Petrosyan stopped Davide Cattaneo with a body shot in round one at Ring Wars in Milan. He rematched Alim Nabiev at Legend 3: Pour Homme in Milan on April 5, 2014, again losing UD.

Petrosyan defeated Mohamed Houmer by knock out in round two at Gorizia Fight Night 2 in Gorizia, Italy on May 25, 2014 to win the vacant ISKA Super Welterweight (-70 kg/154 lb) Oriental Rules World Championship. He defended the title against Yasuhiro Kido at Oktagon 2015: 20 Years Edition in Milan, Italy on April 11, 2015, Charles François at VVWS - Venum Victory World Series in Florence, Italy on December 10, 2016, and Amancio Paraschiv at Bellator Kickboxing 8 in Florence, Italy on December 9, 2017.

Championships and accomplishments

Kickboxing
Dodge Trophy
Dodge Trophy 2008 (-73 kg/161 lb) Runner-up
Haarlem Fight Night
Haarlem Fight Night IV 70 kg/154 lb Tournament Championship
International Sport Karate Association
ISKA Super Welterweight (-70 kg/154 lb) Oriental Rules World Championship (3 title defences)
Muay Thai Association
MTA Italian -70 kg/154 lb Championship
MTA European Championship
World Muay Thai Association
WMTA World Super Welterweight (-69.85 kg/154 lb) Championship
World Professional Kickboxing Council
WPKC Italian Muay Thai Championship

Kickboxing record

|- style="background:#FFBBBB;"
|  2022-11-06 || Loss|| align="left" | Cristian Milea || PetrosyanMania: Petrosyan vs. Milea || Milan, Italy || Decision (Unanimous) || 3 || 3:00
|- style="background:#FFBBBB;"
|  2019-11-16 || Loss|| align="left" | Enriko Kehl || ONE Championship: Age Of Dragons || Beijing, China || TKO (Knees and Punches) || 2 || 1:55
|-  bgcolor="#CCFFCC"
| 2019-05-25|| Win ||align=left| Jordan Watson || Oktagon ||Italy || KO (Right Cross) || 1 || 2:51
|-
|-  bgcolor="#FFBBBB"
| 2018-11-23 || Loss ||align=left| Samy Sana || ONE Championship: Conquest of Champions || Philippines || Decision (Unanimous) || 3 || 3:00
|-
|-  bgcolor="#FFBBBB"
| 2018-07-27 || Loss ||align=left| Chris Ngimbi || ONE Championship: Reign of Kings || Philippines || Decision (Split) || 3 || 3:00
|-  bgcolor="#FFBBBB"
| 2018-01-20 || Loss ||align=left| Yuan Bin || Emei Legend || China || Decision (Unanimous) || 3 || 3:00
|-
|-  bgcolor="#CCFFCC"
| 2017-12-09 || Win ||align=left| Amansio Paraschiv || Bellator Kickboxing 8 at Bellator 187 || Firenze, Italy || TKO (Middle Kick) || 1 || 
|-
! style=background:white colspan=9 |
|-
|-  bgcolor="#CCFFCC"
| 2017-04-08 || Win ||align=left| Mohamed Houmer || Bellator Kickboxing 5|| Torino, Italy || Decision || 3 ||  
|-  bgcolor="#CCFFCC"
| 2016-12-10 || Win ||align=left| Charles François || VVWS - Venum Victory World Series|| Florence, Italy || Decision || 5 || 3:00
|-
! style=background:white colspan=9 |
|-
|-  bgcolor="#FFBBBB"
| 2016-06-24 || Loss ||align=left| Youssef Boughanem ||Monte Carlo Fighting Masters || Monaco || Decision (Unanimous) || 5 || 3:00
|-
! style=background:white colspan=9 |
|-
|-
|-  bgcolor="#CCFFCC"
| 2016-04-16 || Win ||align=left| Wang Tengyue || Oktagon 2016: Turin || Torino, Italy || Decision || 3 ||  
|-  bgcolor="#CCFFCC"
| 2016-03-12 || Win ||align=left| Ridvan Villasaliu || Superpro Fight Night 7 || Basel, Switzerland || TKO || 1 || 3:00
|-  bgcolor="#FFBBBB"
| 2016-02-06 || Loss ||align=left| Armin Pumpanmuang Windy Sport ||Ring War 3 || Monza, Italy || Decision || 5 || 3:00
|-
|-  bgcolor="#CCFFCC"
| 2015-10-24 || Win ||align=left| Luis Castaneda || VVWS || Panama City, Panama || Decision (Unanimous) ||3 ||3:00
|-  bgcolor="#FFBBBB"
| 2015-09-19 || Loss ||align=left| Edye Ruiz ||Fight Nights || Basel, Switzerland || Decision || 3 || 3:00
|-
|-  bgcolor="#CCFFCC"
| 2015-08-01 || Win ||align=left| Yasuhiro Kido || Blade FC 2 || Tokyo, Japan || Decision (unanimous) || 5 || 3:00
|-  bgcolor="#CCFFCC"
| 2015-04-11 || Win ||align=left| Yasuhiro Kido || Oktagon 2015: 20 Years Edition|| Milan, Italy || Decision (unanimous) || 5 || 3:00
|-
! style=background:white colspan=9 |
|-
|-  bgcolor="#CCFFCC"
| 2015-01-24 || Win ||align=left| Joris Bodoignet || Thai Boxe Mania 2015|| Turin, Italy || Decision || 3 || 3:00
|-
|-  bgcolor="#CCFFCC"
| 2014-12-20 || Win ||align=left| Dorel Cristian || KOK World GP 2014 in Chișinău || Chișinău, Moldova || Decision ||3 || 3:00
|-
|-  bgcolor="#FFBBBB"
| 2014-09-13 || Loss ||align=left| Dmitro Konstantynov || Top King World Series - 70 kg Tournament, Final 16 || Minsk, Belarus || Decision (unanimous) || 3 || 3:00
|-
|-  bgcolor="#CCFFCC"
| 2014-05-24 || Win ||align=left| Mohamed Houmer || Gorizia Fight Night 2 || Gorizia, Italy || KO || 2 ||
|-
! style=background:white colspan=9 |
|-
|-  bgcolor="#FFBBBB"
| 2014-04-05 || Loss ||align=left| Alim Nabiev || Legend 3: Pour Homme || Milan, Italy || Decision (unanimous) || 3 || 3:00
|-
|-  bgcolor="#CCFFCC"
| 2014-01-25 || Win ||align=left| Davide Cattaneo || Ring Wars || Milan, Italy || KO (left uppercut to the body) || 1 || 2:18
|-
|-  bgcolor="#FFBBBB"
| 2013-11-16 || Loss ||align=left| Alim Nabiev || W5 Grand Prix Orel XXII || Oryol, Russia || Decision (unanimous) || 3 || 3:00
|-
|-  bgcolor="#CCFFCC"
| 2013-09-28 || Win ||align=left| Mirko Vorkapić || Gorizia Fight Night || Gorizia, Italy || Decision (unanimous) || 3 || 3:00
|-
|-  bgcolor="#CCFFCC"
| 2013-03-24 || Win ||align=left| Henri van Opstal || Haarlem Fight Night IV, Final || Haarlem, Netherlands || TKO (corner stoppage) || 3 || 3:00
|-
! style=background:white colspan=9 |
|-
|-  bgcolor="#CCFFCC"
| 2013-03-24 || Win ||align=left| Robbie Hagemen || Haarlem Fight Night IV, Semi Finals || Haarlem, Netherlands || Decision || 3 || 3:00
|-
|-  bgcolor="#CCFFCC"
| 2013-03-24 || Win ||align=left| Nick Beljaards || Haarlem Fight Night IV, Quarter Finals || Haarlem, Netherlands || TKO (referee stoppage) || 1 || 
|-
|-  bgcolor="#CCFFCC"
| 2012-12-15 || Win ||align=left| Marco Della Gaggia || Armenia vs. Italy || Naples, Italy || Decision || 3 || 3:00
|-
|-  bgcolor="#CCFFCC"
| 2012-01-21 || Win ||align=left| Djimé Coulibaly || Yokkao Extreme 2012 || Milan, Italy || TKO (right cross) || 2 || 
|-
|-  bgcolor="#FFBBBB"
| 2011-11-26 || Loss ||align=left| Yuri Bessmertny || Fight Code Rhinos Series 2011 Part 5, Quarter Finals || Geneva, Switzerland || KO (right hook) || 1 || 
|-
|-  bgcolor="#FFBBBB"
| 2011-10-15 || Loss ||align=left| Yuri Bessmertny || Fight Code Dragon Series 2011 Part 4, Quarter Finals || Marseille, France || Decision (split) || 3 || 3:00
|-
|- style="background:#c5d2ea;"
| 2011-06-11 || Draw ||align=left| Warren Stevelmans || Kickboxing International || Rome, Italy || Draw || 3 || 3:00
|-
|-  bgcolor="#CCFFCC"
| 2011-03-12 || Win ||align=left| Yoshihiro Sato || Fight Code Dragon Series 2011 Part 2 || Milan, Italy || Decision (unanimous) || 3 || 3:00
|-
|-  bgcolor="#CCFFCC"
| 2011-01-29 || Win ||align=left| Miodrag Olar || Thai Boxe Mania || Turin, Italy || Decision || 3 || 3:00
|-
|-  bgcolor="#CCFFCC"
| 2010-12-04 || Win ||align=left| Leroy Kaestner || Janus Fight Night 2010 || Padua, Italy || Decision (unanimous) || 3 || 3:00
|-
|-  bgcolor="#CCFFCC"
| 2010-10-23 || Win ||align=left| Luka Tomic || Grand Prix Di Roma 2010|| Rome, Italy ||Decision (unanimous) || 3 || 3:00
|-
|-  bgcolor="#FFBBBB"
| 2010-07-10 || Loss ||align=left| Pajonsuk SuperPro Samui || Enfusion 1: Test of the Champions, Semi Finals || Lisbon, Portugal || Extension round decision || 4 || 3:00
|-
|-  bgcolor="#FFBBBB"
| 2010-06-26 || Loss ||align=left| Marco Piqué || The Shock || Palermo, Italy || Decision || 5 || 3:00
|-
|-  bgcolor="#CCFFCC"
| 2010-04-10 || Win ||align=left| Farid Maroun || Shardana K-1 || Olbia, Italy || || || 
|-
|-  bgcolor="#CCFFCC"
| 2010-03-13 || Win ||align=left| Dzhabar Askerov || Oktagon presents: It's Showtime 2010 || Milan, Italy || Decision || 3 || 3:00
|-
|-  bgcolor="#CCFFCC"
| 2010-01-00 || Win ||align=left| Mirko Vorkapić || Enfusion 1: Test of the Champions, Quarter Finals || Ko Samui, Thailand || || || 
|-
|-  bgcolor="#CCFFCC"
| 2010-01-20 || Win ||align=left| Vuyisile Colossa || Enfusion 1: Test of the Champions, First Round || Ko Samui, Thailand || Decision || 3 || 3:00
|-
|-  bgcolor="#CCFFCC"
| 2009-11-20 || Win ||align=left| Goran Borović || Ring Rules || Milan, Italy || Decision || 3 || 3:00
|-
|-  bgcolor="#FFBBBB"
| 2009-11-07 || Loss ||align=left| Saiyok Pumpanmuang || Janus Fight Night: Thai Boxe Last Challenge || Padua, Italy || Decision (unanimous) || 3 || 3:00
|-
|-  bgcolor="#FFBBBB"
| 2009-00-00 || Loss ||align=left| Carlo Di Paola || || Italy || Decision || 5 || 2:00
|-
! style=background:white colspan=9 |
|-
|-  bgcolor="#CCFFCC"
| 2009-04-24 || Win ||align=left| Mauro Serra || || Trieste, Italy || KO (punches) || 1 || 
|-
! style=background:white colspan=9 |
|-
|-  bgcolor="#CCFFCC"
| 2009-03-14 || Win ||align=left| Arnaldo Silva || Oktagon presents: It's Showtime 2009 || Milan, Italy || Decision (unanimous) || 3 || 3:00
|-
|-  bgcolor="#CCFFCC"
| 2009-01-30 || Win ||align=left| Abdallah Mabel || Ring Rules || Milan, Italy || || || 
|-
|-  bgcolor="#FFBBBB"
| 2008-11-16 || Loss ||align=left| Vladimír Moravčík || Dodge Trophy 2008, Final || Ulm, Germany || KO || 5 || 
|-
! style=background:white colspan=9 |
|-
|-  bgcolor="#CCFFCC"
| 2008-11-16 || Win ||align=left| Ardalan Sheikoleslamie || Dodge Trophy 2008, Quarter Finals || Ulm, Germany || Decision (split) || 3 || 3:00
|-
|-  bgcolor="#CCFFCC"
| 2008-00-00 || Win ||align=left| Alex Galavotti || || Italy || KO (punches) || 1 || 
|-
|-  bgcolor="#CCFFCC"
| 2007-04-05 || Win ||align=left| Fabio Siciliani || Trieste Fight Night || Trieste, Italy || KO || 4 || 
|-
|-  bgcolor="#CCFFCC"
| 2007-00-00 || Win ||align=left| Francesco Tadiello || || Italy || Decision || 3 || 3:00
|-
|-  bgcolor="#FFBBBB"
| 2006-06-10 || Loss ||align=left| Fabio Corelli || S-1 Muay Thai Middle Europe Tournament, Final || Nova Gorica, Slovenia || Decision || 3 || 3:00
|-
| colspan=9 | Legend:

See also
 Oktagon management
 Giorgio Petrosyan

References

External links
 Official Enfusion profile

1986 births
Living people
Armenian male kickboxers
Italian male kickboxers
Middleweight kickboxers
Armenian Muay Thai practitioners
Italian Muay Thai practitioners
Sportspeople from Yerevan
People from Gorizia
Armenian emigrants to Italy
Naturalised citizens of Italy
Italian people of Armenian descent
ONE Championship kickboxers
Sportspeople from Friuli-Venezia Giulia